Jakez Cornou (1935 – 1 September 2022) was a French historian, ethnologist, and author. He lived in Bigouden and pursued passions in history, ethnography, and heritage of the Bretons. He was a co-founder of the newspapers  and Pays de Quimper en Cornouaille. He also directed the publishing house Éditions Sked and was a member of the collective , which sought to promote literature in the Pays Bigouden.

Bibliography
Origine et histoire des Bigoudens (1977)
Ar vro Vigoudenn Gwechall, le Pays Bigouden autrefois (1978)
Les loups en Bretagne (1982)
L'Odyssée du vaisseau 'Droits de l'Homme', l'expédition d'Irlande de 1796 (1988)
La Coiffe Bigoudène, histoire d'une étrange parure (1993)
Combat et naufrage du vaisseau 'Droits de l'Homme' 1797 (1997)
L'Héroïque combat de la 'Cordelière' 1512 (1998)
Naufrage et pillage du "Saint Jacques" à la pointe de la Torche en 1716 (1999)

References

1935 births
2022 deaths
French historians
French ethnologists
People from Brest, France